Tayloria tenuis is a species of moss belonging to the family Splachnaceae.

It is native to Europe and Northern America.

References

Splachnales
Taxa named by James Dickson (botanist)